In mathematics, the Garnir relations give a way of expressing a basis of the Specht modules Vλ in terms of standard polytabloids.

Specht modules in terms of polytabloids
Given a partition λ of n, one has the Specht module Vλ. In characteristic 0, this is an irreducible representation of the symmetric group Sn. One can construct Vλ explicitly in terms of polytabloids as follows:
 Start with the permutation representation of Sn acting on all Young tableaux of shape λ, which are fillings of the Young diagram of λ with numbers 1, 2, ... n, each used once (note that we do not require the tableaux to be standard, there are no conditions imposed along rows or columns). The group Sn acts by permuting the positions in each tableau (for instance there is a cyclic permutation the cycles the entries of the first row one place forward).
 A Young tabloid is an orbit of Young tableaux under the action of the row permutations, the subgroup of Sn of permutations that permute the positions in each row separately (this "Young subgroup" is a product of symmetric groups, one for each row). The Young tabloid of T is denoted {T}.
 Now consider the free Abelian group of polytabloids, the formal linear combinations with integer coefficients of Young tabloids. To any Young tableau T one associates a polytabloid eT as follows. One first forms the orbit of T under the action of the group  of column permutations (another Young subgroup, defined similarly to row permutations but permuting positions within individual columns only). Then, writing the result of action on a tableau T by a column permutation σ as Tσ, defines:

 does not imply , since the actions of row and column permutations do not commute in general.
 The Specht module Vλ is then the subspace of the space of all polytabloids spanned by the polytabloids eT for all Young tableaux T of shape λ.

Straightening polytabloids and the Garnir elements
The above construction gives an explicit description of the Specht module Vλ. However, the polytabloids associated to different Young tableaux are not necessarily linearly independent, indeed, the dimension of Vλ is exactly the number of standard Young tableaux of shape λ. In fact, the polytabloids associated to standard Young tableaux span Vλ; to express other polytabloids in terms of them, one uses a straightening algorithm.

Given a Young tableau S, we construct the polytabloid eS as above. Without loss of generality, all columns of S are increasing, otherwise we could instead start with the modified Young tableau with increasing columns, whose polytabloid will differ at most by a sign. S is then said to not have any column descents. We want to express eS as a linear combination of standard polytabloids, i.e. polytabloids associated to standard Young tableaux. This then expresses S in terms of polytabloids that are closer to being standard. The permutations that achieve this are the Garnir elements.

Suppose we want to eliminate a row descent in the Young tableau T. We pick two subsets A and B of the boxes of T as in the following diagram:

Then the Garnir element  is defined to be , where the πi are the permutations of the entries of the boxes of A and B that keep both subsets A and B without column descents.

Example
Consider the following Young tableau:

There is a row descent in the second row, so we choose the subsets A and B as indicated, which gives us the following:

This gives us the Garnir element . This allows us to remove the row descent in the second row, but this has also introduced other descents in other places. But there is a way in which all tableaux obtained like this are closer to being standard, this is measured by a dominance order on polytabloids. Therefore, one can repeatedly apply this procedure to straighten a polytabloid, eventually writing it as a linear combination of standard polytabloids, showing that the Specht module is spanned by the standard polytabloids. As they are also linearly independent, they form a basis of this module.

Other interpretations 
There is a similar description for the irreducible representations of GLn. In that case, one can consider the Weyl modules associated to a partition λ, which can be described in terms of bideterminants. One has a similar straightening algorithm, but this time in terms of semistandard Young tableaux.

References
 William Fulton. Young Tableaux, with Applications to Representation Theory and Geometry. Cambridge University Press, 1997. 
 Bruce E. Sagan. The Symmetric Group. Springer, 2001.
  James Alexander Green. Polynomial Representations of GLn. Springer Lecture Notes In Mathematics, 2007.

Algebraic combinatorics
Representation theory
Representation theory of finite groups